Stolen Spring is a 1993 Danish film adaptation of Hans Scherfig's novel The Stolen Spring directed by .

Stolen Spring was shot in 1993 starring some of the biggest stars in Danish Cinema, such as Frits Helmuth.

Some critics think that the movie remake has failed to retain this and other thematics, and therefore does not deliver Scherfig's socialist message.

Cast 
 Frits Helmuth as Professor Blomme
 Tomas Villum Jensen as Edvard Ellerstrøm (young) (as Tomas Willum Jensen)
 Jesper Langberg as Edvard Ellerstrøm (adult)
 Adam Simonsen as Michael Mogensen (young)
  as Michael Mogensen (adult)
 René Hansen as Thygesen (young)
  as Thygesen (adult)
 Ken Vedsegaard as Aksel Nielsen (young)

References

External links 
 
 
 

1993 drama films
1993 films
Danish drama films
1990s Danish-language films